WVIE (107.3 FM) is a radio station in Charlotte Amalie, U.S. Virgin Islands. The station is licensed to Virgin Islands Radio Entertainment Detroit, LLC, which is wholly owned by R.J. Watkins Group; a sale to Educational Media Foundation is pending. WVIE carries network programming from K-LOVE, EMF's main Contemporary Christian music network.

Ownership
The station, then known as WVGN, was acquired by Caribbean Broadcasting Network (then known as LKK Group; Keith Bass, President) from Calypso Communications in 2002.

While Caribbean Broadcasting Network is a company whose television stations are affiliates of commercial networks, WVGN was operated under a separate arm, Caribbean Community Broadcasting, and solicited and accepted donations from listeners, as would most other NPR members.

Caribbean Broadcasting Network reached a deal to sell WVGN to R.J. Watkins, owner of WHPR-FM and operator of W33BY-D in Detroit, on August 7, 2014; the sale was completed on February 17, 2015, accompanied by a call sign change to WVIE. WVGN's NPR programming continued through March 15, 2015; Watkins replaced this programming with contemporary music and talk shows.

Since November 7, 2015, WVIE's signal was simulcast on W33BY's 3rd subchannel. Until then, it had been a SD simulcast of 33.1, 33.2 and 33.4, however, are still simulcasting W33BY-DT1 in SD.

References

External links
 WVIE official website
 

VIE
Radio stations established in 1991
1991 establishments in the United States Virgin Islands
Charlotte Amalie, U.S. Virgin Islands
Educational Media Foundation radio stations
K-Love radio stations